Glaciimonas singularis is a rod-shaped, Gram-negative bacterium of the genus Glaciimonas which was isolated from a uranium mine wastewater treatment plant. G. singularis grows optimally at 25 °C. Phylogenetic analysis has shown G. singularis belongs to the Oxalobacteraceae family and is very similar to Glaciimonas immobilis.

References

External links
Type strain of Glaciimonas singularis at BacDive -  the Bacterial Diversity Metadatabase

Burkholderiales